LACTOR (London Association of Classical Teachers - Original Records) are a series of sourcebooks published by the LACTOR committee since 1968. The books give translations of primary source material, accompanied by relevant annotations. They are designed so that the reader requires no prior knowledge on the area. The books cover the history of Greece between 478 BC and 323 BC, and the history of Rome between 113 BC and 117 AD. The history of Roman Britain is also covered, between 113 BC and 410 AD. Parts of LACTOR are used in OCR's GCE Advanced Level Ancient History and Classical Civilisation courses.

Publications

References

Classics publications
History books about ancient Greece
History books about ancient Rome